V.C.L.: Vehicular Combat League Presents - Motor Mayhem, also known as simply Motor Mayhem, is a vehicular combat game developed by Beyond Games and published by Infogrames for PlayStation 2 in 2001.

Gameplay
Similar to other arena-based vehicular combat games like Twisted Metal, Motor Mayhem is a game based on the concept of a violent and futuristic motor-sport event. The player directly controls a customized combat vehicle in a land-based arena and battles against another player or computer controlled opponents. Each vehicle has a distinctive character and unique special attacks. Each themed arena has additional weapons and upgrades for the vehicles to pick up. Points are awarded for the destruction of an enemy vehicle. The first contestant to achieve a target score, or that has the highest score when time expires, is the winner.

Reception

The game received "mixed" reviews according to the review aggregation website Metacritic. Daniel Erickson of NextGen called it "An inoffensive offering that falls short of the competition."

References

External links
 

2001 video games
Beyond Games games
Infogrames games
PlayStation 2 games
PlayStation 2-only games
Vehicular combat games
Video games developed in the United States
Multiplayer and single-player video games